The 1996 European Archery Championships is  the 14th edition of the European Archery Championships. The event was held in Kranjska Gora, Slovenia from 17 to 23 June, 1996.

Medal table

Medal summary

Recurve

Compound

References

External links
 Results

European Archery Championships
1996 in archery
International sports competitions hosted by Slovenia
1996 in European sport